This is a list of current United States lieutenant governors by age. Also included are the age of the lieutenant governor at inauguration, and the length of their gubernatorial term to date.

See also 
 List of current United States governors by age

References

Lists of political office-holders by age
 Current age
Lists of current office-holders of country subdivisions
Lieutenant Governors